In mathematics, more specifically in differential geometry and topology, various types of functions between manifolds are studied, both as objects in their own right and for the light they shed

Types of maps 
Just as there are various types of manifolds, there are various types of maps of manifolds.

In geometric topology, the basic types of maps correspond to various categories of manifolds: DIFF for smooth functions between differentiable manifolds, PL for piecewise linear functions between piecewise linear manifolds, and TOP for continuous functions between topological manifolds. These are progressively weaker structures, properly connected via PDIFF, the category of piecewise-smooth maps between piecewise-smooth manifolds.

In addition to these general categories of maps, there are maps with special properties; these may or may not form categories, and may or may not be generally discussed categorically.

In geometric topology a basic type are embeddings, of which knot theory is a central example, and generalizations such as immersions, submersions, covering spaces, and ramified covering spaces.
Basic results include the Whitney embedding theorem and Whitney immersion theorem.

 
In complex geometry, ramified covering spaces are used to model Riemann surfaces, and to analyze maps between surfaces, such as by the Riemann–Hurwitz formula.

In Riemannian geometry, one may ask for maps to preserve the Riemannian metric, leading to notions of isometric embeddings, isometric immersions, and Riemannian submersions; a basic result is the Nash embedding theorem.

Scalar-valued functions 

A basic example of maps between manifolds are scalar-valued functions on a manifold,  or  sometimes called regular functions or functionals, by analogy with algebraic geometry or linear algebra. These are of interest both in their own right, and to study the underlying manifold.

In geometric topology, most commonly studied are Morse functions, which yield handlebody decompositions, which generalize to Morse–Bott functions and can be used for instance to understand classical groups, such as in Bott periodicity.

In mathematical analysis, one often studies solution to partial differential equations, an important example of which is harmonic analysis, where one studies harmonic functions: the kernel of the Laplace operator. This leads to such functions as the spherical harmonics, and to heat kernel methods of studying manifolds, such as hearing the shape of a drum and some proofs of the Atiyah–Singer index theorem.

The monodromy around a singularity or branch point is an important part of analyzing such functions.

Curves and paths 

Dual to scalar-valued functions – maps  – are maps  which correspond to curves or paths in a manifold. One can also define these where the domain is an interval  especially the unit interval  or where the domain is a circle (equivalently, a periodic path) S1, which yields a loop. These are used to define the fundamental group, chains in homology theory, geodesic curves, and systolic geometry.

Embedded paths and loops lead to knot theory, and related structures such as links, braids, and tangles.

Metric spaces 
Riemannian manifolds are special cases of metric spaces, and thus one has a notion of Lipschitz continuity, Hölder condition, together with a coarse structure, which leads to notions such as coarse maps and connections with geometric group theory.

See also 
 :Category:Maps of manifolds